The Rein da Medel is the longest headwater of the Rhine. It is located in the Swiss cantons of Ticino and Graubünden and flows through the valleys Val Cadlimo and Val Medel. Rein da Medel is the local Sursilvan, (i.e. Romansh) name in Graubünden, which is commonly used to denote the Ticino part as well.

The most important places along the river are the villages Curaglia and Platta in the municipality of Medel.

Course of the river 
The headwaters of the Rein da Medel flow through the Val Cadlimo, a valley south of the main Alpine ridge in the municipality of Quinto in the canton of Ticino.

There are three almost equally strong source streams:
 The southern spring stream flows through the Lago Scuro (2451m, between Punta Negra and Bassa del Lago Scuro)
 The central spring stream rises on the Botta di Cadlimo (2534m) and shortly thereafter flows through the Lago di Dentro
 The northern spring stream rises beneath the Pizzo Curnera.

The northern spring stream is about 640 meters long.

About a kilometer after the confluence of these spring creeks, the Reno di Medel flows through the Lago dell'Isra (2322m). A gorge runs under the Gotthard Base Tunnel and marks the transition from the Val Medel to the Val Cadlimo. Just below the gorge opens out, a tributary flows in from the south, which comes down from the Passo dell'Uomo via the Val Termine valley. In this area, the Reno di Medel form the boundary between the municipalities of Quinto and Blenio. A few meters north of the inflow into the Lai da Sontga Maria reservoir (1908m), the boundary between Ticino and Graubünden is a straight line between Lukmanier Pass and Pizzo Scai, which ignores the local topography.

In Graubünden, the river flows through the Sursilvan speaking part of the canton. The middle section of the river is called Froda; the lower section is called Rein da Medel. The name change takes place at the confluence of major tributary Rein da Cristallina. The middle and lower sections of the river are in the Val Medel valley. Most of this section is in the municipality of Medel, except the uppermost bit is in Ticino and the last kilometer is in the municipality of Disentis/Muster.

A small valley branches off to the south-east from the Val Medel towards the Lukmanier Pass. The entrance to this valley is covered by the Lai da Sontga Maria reservoir. Numerous small tributaries flow into the Reno di Medel throughout the entire Val Medel. The last two kilometers are through a canyon named Las Ruinas, where the Reno di Medel flows into the Anterior Rhine at about 1075 m above sea level, just below the road bridge across the Anterior Rhine in the road to the Lukmanier Pass.

Flow lengths 
The total flow length of the net since Medel is about 25.4 km. The lengths of the various sections are approximately:
 Southern headwater: 0.99 km
 Western headwater: 1.00 km
 Northern headwater: 0.64 km
 Reno di Medel (upper reaches of the Val Cadlimo, plus part of the middle reaches in Ticino, excluding Lai da Sontga Maria): 6.76 km
 Lai da Sontga Maria: 2.67 km
 Froda (dried part of the middle reaches without Lai da Santa Maria): 5.91 km
 Reno di Medel (lower reaches): 9.05 km

Neighboring river basins 
The key neighboring river basins in the Rhine system, those of the Reno Anteriur (Anterior Rhine), the Reno da Nalps and the Reno da Sumvitg and in the catchment area of the Po the rivers of Canaria, Murinascia Grande and Brenno.

Gallery

Footnotes 

Rivers of Switzerland